Gurukula Vidya Peeth (GVP) is an Indian high school located in Sagar Road, Ibrahim Patan, Rangareddy, Telangana, India.

The school promotes rural employment and secondary education to urban children. It is a residential school and its facilities include labs, a library and grounds.

External links

Schools in Telangana
Ranga Reddy district
Educational institutions in India with year of establishment missing